Mario Bilen (born 23 January 1985 in Vinkovci, Croatia) is a Croatian professional footballer who currently plays for NRFL Division 2 club Ngaruawahia United.

Club career

A stalwart in Croatia's top-flight, the 1.HNL. and youth national teams, where he befriended Luka Modric, Bilen immigrated to New Zealand in 2013 to sign for 9x OFC Oceania Champions League winners, Auckland City FC. After leading the defensive line for the club in over 100 top-flight matches in New Zealand, Bilen departed the club in December 2022, aged 36.

He is widely regarded as a club legend at City and played an instrumental role in the club's third-place finish at the FIFA Club World Cup in 2014 as the starting centre-back.

Following his departure from Auckland City, he joined Ngaruawahia United on the eve of their promotion playoff into NRFL Division 2 against Papakura City. He made his debut for Ngaruawahia in the first game of the NRFL Division 2 season in a 2-0 away win over West Auckland.

References

External links

1985 births
Living people
Sportspeople from Vinkovci
Association football midfielders
Croatian footballers
Croatia youth international footballers
HNK Cibalia players
NK Hrvatski Dragovoljac players
HNK Orašje players
NK Slaven Belupo players
Flamurtari Vlorë players
HNK Vukovar '91 players
NK Zadar players
Auckland City FC players
Croatian Football League players
Premier League of Bosnia and Herzegovina players
New Zealand Football Championship players
Croatian expatriate footballers
Expatriate footballers in  Bosnia and Herzegovina
Croatian expatriate sportspeople in  Bosnia and Herzegovina
Expatriate footballers in Albania
Croatian expatriate sportspeople in Albania
Expatriate association footballers in New Zealand
Croatian expatriate sportspeople in New Zealand